Derrick Dewan Brooks (born April 18, 1973) is an American former professional football player who was an outside linebacker for his entire 14-year career in the National Football League (NFL) with the Tampa Bay Buccaneers. Brooks played college football at Florida State, where he twice received consensus All-American honors, and was selected by the Buccaneers in the first round of the 1995 NFL Draft. An 11-time Pro Bowl selection and five-time first-team All-Pro, Brooks was the NFL Defensive Player of the Year in 2002 en route to winning the franchise's first Super Bowl title in Super Bowl XXXVII. Following his retirement, Brooks served as co-owner and president of the Tampa Bay Storm in the Arena Football League (AFL) from 2011 to 2017. He was inducted to the Pro Football Hall of Fame in 2014 and the College Football Hall of Fame in 2016.

Early years
Brooks attended Washington High School in Pensacola, Florida. In his senior season in 1991, Brooks carried Pensacola to the state playoff semifinals, where they lost to the eventual champion Manatee Hurricanes of Bradenton, Florida. In 2007, he was named to the Florida High School Athletic Association All-Century Team, which selected the Top 33 players in the 100-year history of high school football in the state of Florida's history.

College career
While attending Florida State University, he played for the Seminoles from 1991 to 1994.  He was a four-year letterman, a consensus first-team All-American his junior and senior years, and a three-time first-team All-Atlantic Coast Conference (ACC) selection.  After playing as safety as a freshman he switched to linebacker as a sophomore.  He was a member of the 1993 Seminoles National Championship team.  He finished his career with 274 tackles, five interceptions, 8.5 sacks, 13 passes defensed, four forced fumbles, and three fumble recoveries.

In November 2010, Florida State retired Seminoles jersey number 10 in honor of Brooks.

Awards and honors
 3× First-team All-Atlantic Coast Conference (1992, 1993, 1994)
 ACC Defensive Player of the Year (1993)
 2× Consensus first-team All-American (1993, 1994)
 2× Vince Lombardi Award finalist (1993, 1994)
 Bowl Coalition National Championship (1993)

Professional career

Early career (1995–2002) 
The Tampa Bay Buccaneers selected Brooks in the first round (28th overall) of the 1995 NFL Draft. The Buccaneers traded both of their second-round picks (46th overall and 63rd overall) to the Dallas Cowboys for their first-round pick (28th overall) and used the pick to draft Brooks. Brooks was the second linebacker drafted in 1995 NFL Draft, behind Washington State's Mark Fields (13th overall).

Brooks played 14 years for the Buccaneers and is widely considered one of the best players in franchise history and one of the best linebackers in NFL history. From 1995 to 2008, Brooks started 221 of 224 games, recording 1,698 tackles, 13.5 sacks, 25 interceptions, and six touchdowns (tied for the most in NFL history by a linebacker with Bobby Bell). He was selected to the Pro Bowl 11 times, including 10 straight from 1997 to 2006, was an All-Pro nine times, was the AP NFL Defensive Player of the Year in 2002, and led the team to the franchise's first Super Bowl win in Super Bowl XXXVII.

As a rookie in 1995, Brooks started 13 of 16 games. He finished the season with 78 tackles with a sack and earned first-team all-rookie honors from Pro Football Weekly and Pro Football Writers Association. During his second season 1996, he started all 16 games and finished with a team-leading 132 tackles and his first career interception. In 1997, Brooks earned his first trip to the Pro Bowl after recording 144 tackles, 1.5 sacks, and two interceptions in 16 games. In 1998, Brooks had another Pro Bowl season after recording 156 tackles and an interception.

In 1999, Brooks made the Pro Bowl for the third time and was a first-team All-Pro selection for the first time in his career. For the season, he had 153 tackles, two sacks, and four interceptions. In 2000, Brooks earned his fourth consecutive trip to the Pro Bowl and his second consecutive first-team All-Pro selection. He finished the season with 140 tackles, a sack, and had his first career touchdown on a 34-yard interception from Minnesota Vikings quarterback Daunte Culpepper. Brooks was also, along with Jim Flanigan of the Chicago Bears, the winner of the Walter Payton Man of the Year Award, given to a National Football League player for his community service activities as well as his excellence on the field. Brooks made his fifth consecutive Pro Bowl in 2001 after recording 112 tackles and three interceptions.

Continued success and Super Bowl victory (2002–2008) 

Brooks' best season came in 2002. During that year he was named NFL Defensive Player of the Year by the Associated Press and helped the Buccaneers win the franchise's first Super Bowl. He also made his sixth consecutive Pro Bowl and was a first-team All-Pro selection for the third time. For the season he had 117 tackles, a sack, five interceptions, and returned an NFL record, for a linebacker, four touchdowns (one off a fumble and three off interceptions). During the Buccaneers 48-21 victory over the Oakland Raiders in Super Bowl XXXVII, he returned an interception off of Raiders quarterback Rich Gannon 44 yards for the clinching touchdown.

In 2003, Brooks broke Lee Roy Selmon's team record for most consecutive Pro Bowl appearances with seven. He finished the season with 101 tackles, a sack, two interceptions, and returned an interception for a touchdown. In 2004, Brooks made his eighth consecutive Pro Bowl and fifth- first-team All-Pro selection after recording 137 tackles, three sacks, and an interception. In 2005, Brooks made his ninth consecutive Pro Bowl and earned his sixth first-team All-Pro selection. He finished the season with 125 tackles, three sacks, and an interception.

In Brooks' 10th consecutive Pro Bowl in 2006, he was named the MVP after returning a Trent Green interception 59 yards for a touchdown to secure the victory for the NFC. During the regular season he had 121 tackles, three interceptions and a touchdown. In 2007, Brooks had 109 tackles and was not voted to the Pro Bowl for the first time since 1996. In Brooks' last year with the Buccaneers in 2008, he recorded 73 tackles and an interception and was selected to his 11th Pro Bowl. The 11 Pro Bowls are tied for second-most by a linebacker in NFL history.

Tampa Bay exit and retirement 
On February 25, 2009, the Buccaneers released Brooks. He was one of five veterans that the Bucs released on that day. The others were wide receivers Joey Galloway and Ike Hilliard, running back Warrick Dunn and linebacker Cato June. The Bucs had previously fired Head Coach Jon Gruden and General Manager Bruce Allen and were looking to build a younger team under the likes of Raheem Morris and Mark Dominik. Brooks never missed a game in his 14 years in Tampa Bay, a total of 224 consecutive games. He was the starting weakside linebacker for the last 208 of those games, an NFL record for that position and the second-longest consecutive start streak for any linebacker in NFL history.

After spending all of the 2009 season as a free agent, Brooks officially announced his retirement on August 11, 2010.

On January 10, 2014, Brooks was named among the 15 modern-era Pro Football Hall of Fame finalists. Former Buccaneers safety John Lynch (who was Brooks' teammate from 1995 to 2003) and former Buccaneers head coach Tony Dungy (who coached Brooks from 1996 to 2001) were also finalists.  On February 1, Brooks was elected to the Hall of Fame in his first year of eligibility.  He is the third Hall of Famer to have earned his credentials primarily as a Buc, the others being Lee Roy Selmon and Warren Sapp (Brooks' teammate from 1995 to 2003).

NFL career statistics

Broadcast and executive career
Brooks previously was a football analyst for ESPN and co-host of The Red Zone on Sirius NFL Radio and as an analyst on ESPN First Take.

In 2011, Brooks became a part owner and the team president for the Tampa Bay Storm of the Arena Football League. The team folded in December 2017.

Since 2014, Brooks has served as a jointly-appointed appeals officer for the NFL and NFL Players Association, charged with reviewing discipline for in-game misconduct.

Personal life
Brooks is married and has four children. Brooks is a Christian.

Derrick Brooks is the founder of the Brooks Bunch charity and youth scholarship foundation in the Tampa Bay area.  He has taken local youth across the nation and South Africa with the objective of presenting a first-hand experience, or a "mobile classroom."  Brooks also headed the founding of the Brooks-DeBartolo Collegiate High School in Tampa with fellow Pro Football Hall of Fame member Edward J. DeBartolo Jr.

Brooks is well known for his charity work and his advocacy of the importance of education.  He was the co-recipient of the 2000 Walter Payton Man of the Year Award and was named to the Florida State University Board of Trustees in 2003 by Governor Jeb Bush.

References

External links

 
Official Website
Derrick Brooks Charities
Tampa Bay Buccaneers bio

1973 births
Living people
African-American Christians
African-American players of American football
All-American college football players
American football linebackers
Florida State Seminoles football players
National Conference Pro Bowl players
National Football League players with retired numbers
Players of American football from Pensacola, Florida
Sportspeople from Pensacola, Florida
Tampa Bay Buccaneers players
Pro Football Hall of Fame inductees
Arena Football League executives
21st-century African-American sportspeople
20th-century African-American sportspeople
National Football League Defensive Player of the Year Award winners
Ed Block Courage Award recipients